Cheap Freaks are a garage rock band based in Dublin, Ireland.

History 
Bass guitar/vocalist Robbie Brady, a former member of Irish garage rock band The Things formed the band in 2009 with fellow Dublin born guitarist/vocalist Alan Dodd, who also shares songwriting and vocal duties with Brady. They have released a handful of EPs and one full-length LP on US indie label Big Neck Records in 2012. Over the years they have had numerous line up changes with the latest that includes band members Sean Goucher and Dave Mulvaney. The band have toured throughout Europe and their homeland and have opened for acts such as Beady Eye, The Buzzcocks, Wire, Jay Reatard and many others. The band are currently working on their 2nd LP.

Discography

See also 
 List of Irish musical groups
 List of garage rock bands

External links 
Cheap Freaks Official page
Cheap Freaks on Big Neck Records

References
Ox-Fanzine Review
Maximum Rock'n'Roll Magazine Review
Razorcake Review
Interview with Brady at musikknyheter.no

Musical groups established in 2009
Musical quartets
Irish rock music groups
Musical groups from Dublin (city)